

Canadian Football News in 1886

Final regular season standings
Note: GP = Games Played, W = Wins, L = Losses, T = Ties, PF = Points For, PA = Points Against, Pts = Points
*Bold text means that they have clinched the playoffs

League Champions

Playoffs

QRFU Final

ORFU College Final

ORFU Final

Dominion Championship
No dominion championship was played.

References

 
Canadian Football League seasons